Natalya Anatolyevna Snytina born 13 February 1971 in Zlatoust) is a Russian biathlete. At the 1994 Winter Olympics in Lillehammer, she won a gold medal with the Russian relay team.

References

External links

1971 births
Living people
Russian female biathletes
Olympic biathletes of Russia
Biathletes at the 1994 Winter Olympics
Olympic gold medalists for Russia
People from Zlatoust
Olympic medalists in biathlon
Medalists at the 1994 Winter Olympics
Sportspeople from Chelyabinsk Oblast